Oglethorpe County High School is an American four-year comprehensive high school in Lexington, Georgia. It is the only high school in the Oglethorpe County School District, and opened in 1924 as a public school.

History
Oglethorpe County High School was preceded by the Meson Academy, which opened in Lexington in 1806 and ran as an academy for school children with separate male and female departments until its closure in 1918. After the academy's closure a local group called the Lexington Woman's Club which had formed in 1916, lobbied for the creation of a new school in its place. Because of their efforts, the Meson Academy was reopened as Oglethorpe County High School in 1924–1925. The reopening of the school included adding a playground and repainting of the interior of the school in 1924, and adding 100 additional mahogany opera chairs in the school's auditorium, which was used by the Lexington Woman's Club for meetings.

The Lexington Women's Club continued their involvement with Oglethorpe County High School for several years, including bestowing honorary membership to teachers of the school and fundraising for school equipment.

The school started a joint program with the University of Georgia's College of Education in the late 1980s called OH-STAY (short for Oglethorpe High STAY) to try to tackle the school's high dropout rate. The program used a $55,000 grant from the Metropolitan Life Foundation to pay for a student advocate who helped keep students in school and provided tutoring, while also training teachers to look for signs of and preemptively address potential dropouts. The school had 65 students dropout in 1985, compared to 4 in 1987, with several students returning to complete their education. As a result of the program the school's 43% dropout rate in the 1985–86 school year dropped to 17% by the end of the 1987–88 school year.

Enrollment
As of the 2020–2021 school year, the school had an enrollment of 637 students and 42 professional classroom teachers with 1 provisional classroom teacher, for a student–teacher ratio of 16.01. 257 of the students were eligible for free school meals, while 42 were eligible for reduced-price meals. The graduation rate for the 2020–2021 school year was 94.2%, with 73.6% of graduates considered college ready according to the school's College and Career Ready Performance Index (CCRPI) score.

The average number of years of experience for a teacher at the school for the 2020–2021 school year was 14 years. The per pupil expenditure for the 2020–2021 school year was $10,255 per student, compared to a statewide average of $10,910 per student.

Sports
Oglethorpe County High School is part of the Georgia High School Association's GHSA Class A Division I Region 5.

References

Public high schools in Georgia (U.S. state)
Educational institutions established in 1924